Netoglitazone (also called MCC-555) is a hypoglycemic agent belonging to the thiazolidinedione group.

References 

Fluoroarenes
Naphthol ethers
Thiazolidinediones